Davi Rossetto de Oliveira Athayde (born July 27, 1992), is a Brazilian professional basketball player who currently plays with Minas in the Novo Basquete Brasil (NBB). He is 6'1" (1.85 m) and is a point guard.

Youth career
Rossetto started playing with São Paulo's Hebraica in 2003 at age 10. He later played with Círculo Militar until joining the Pinheiros youth system in 2005. With the Pinheiros youth teams, Rossetto won a number of titles, and earned a respectable reputation. He made the U-17 national team in 2009.

Professional career

Pinheiros
Rossetto started to play with the men's first team of Pinheiros in the 2010 season, and was a part of the club's Paulista State Championship winning side in 2011. He subsequently left, looking for more playing time.

Solar Cearense
Rossetto signed with Solar Cearense in 2012. During his first season in Fortaleza, he struggled to adapt and did not see the court much. In his second season, he alternated between the first team, in the NBB, and the Under-22 side in the Development League. The team lost to Bauru in the NBB's playoff quarterfinals. In the LDB, despite being eliminated in the final round, he finished as the game's assist leader.

In the 2014–15 season, Rossetto improved his play, and won the NBB's Most Improved Player award, despite his team missing the playoffs. He also won the LDB title with the club's Under-22 side, in a perfect season campaign (28–0). He was named the development league's Finals MVP.

Flamengo
On July 10, 2018, Rossetto signed with Flamengo for the 2018–19 NBB season.

Minas Tênis Clube
On July 5, 2019, Rossetto signed with Minas for the 2019–20 NBB season.

National team career
Rossetto has previously been a member of the senior Brazilian national basketball team. He played at the 2017 FIBA AmeriCup.

References

External links
FIBA Profile
Latinbasket.com Profile
New Basket Brazil Profile 

1992 births
Living people
Associação de Basquete Cearense players
Brazilian men's basketball players
Esporte Clube Pinheiros basketball players
Associação de Basquete Cearense basketball players
Flamengo basketball players
Minas Tênis Clube basketball players
Novo Basquete Brasil players
Point guards
Basketball players from São Paulo